Don Macintosh (6 November 1931 – 20 June 1994) was a Canadian basketball player. He competed in the men's tournament at the 1956 Summer Olympics.

References

1931 births
1994 deaths
Basketball people from British Columbia
Canadian men's basketball players
Olympic basketball players of Canada
Basketball players at the 1956 Summer Olympics
Basketball players from Vancouver